An egg wash is beaten eggs, sometimes mixed with another liquid such as water or milk, which is sometimes brushed onto the surface of a pastry before baking. Egg washes are also used as a step in the process of breading foods, providing a substrate for the breading to stick to. Egg washes can also be used on calzones or on fish.

Use in pastries
An egg wash is often used to make pastries shiny and golden or brown in color, and it also is used to help toppings or coatings stick to the surface of the pastry, or to bind pastry parts together, such as empanadas or other en croute recipes. Egg wash can usually be made with 30 ml or two tablespoons of liquid, such as milk or water, for every egg. Less liquid makes for a darker wash. The part of the egg used and liquid added determines the finished look of the crust.

Vegan varieties
Vegan substitutes for egg wash include vegetable oil, non-dairy milk and butter substitutes, and light corn syrup thinned with water.

References

Food ingredients